JSC Votkinsk Machine Building Plant is a machine and ballistic missile production enterprise based in Votkinsk, Republic of Udmurtia, Russia. Its production includes the RS-24 Yars intercontinental ballistic missile, Russia's  most recent ICBM development, as well as the submarine-launched Bulava SLBM.

Incorporated as a Federal State Unitary Enterprise until 2010, it is now an open joint-stock company.

The company has two separate facilities: a final assembly plant located some 12 kilometers outside of Votkinsk where missiles are assembled, and the main plant, located in downtown Votkinsk, where missile components as well as civil and consumer goods are produced.

History

The plant from its foundation until 1917 
Plans for an ironworks first arose in connection with the depletion of forests near then existing mining enterprises in the Urals (mid-18th century). Most firewood had to be delivered from a great distance that naturally resulted in substantial production overruns. The only solution was to relocate manufacturing to the areas, where forests were untouched. For this purpose, Izhevsk ironworks was built in 1760-63.

The location for the plant was selected first because of its proximity to the major waterway (the Kama River that flows 15-20 kilometers from the present-day city of Votkinsk). Some other considerations were also taken into account: its close proximity to the forests that were the main energy source for steel industry of that day, as well as its proximity to the mining companies.

In between 1754 and 1763, 42 private factories were built in total. They belonged to the gentry of the Russian Empire (including Count P.I. Shuvalov, Count M.E. Vorontsov). In 1763, after Shuvalov's death, Votkinsk and Izhevsk pkants passed over to the state for repayment of Shuvalovs' debts, becoming state enterprises. 

Later on, the plant produced anchors, railway equipment, ships, excavators, gold mining drags and various types of military equipment. For example, starting from 1773, the plant began to produce steel anchors for domestic military shipbuilding under the decree of Empress Catherine II. In the first half of the 19th century, the plant produced at least 62 percent of total amount of anchors in Russia.

The enterprise was one of the most advanced for its time. In 1811, it started to produce steel and cast iron, based upon a new method developed by the engineer Badaev who was a self-taught talented metallurgist. This high-quality steel was used in the production of various tools, including metal cutting, medical and stamps.

A valuable way to appreciate the skills of Votkinsk artisans was an order in 1858 on the fabrication and assembling of the spire's frame for the Peter and Paul Cathedral in St. Petersburg.

In 1871, the plant was set to work making open hearth furnaces being the second in Russia and the first in the Urals on this indicator. Moreover, the plant produced armour steel for the needs of domestic military shipbuilding.

In the 1840s, under the supervision of Ilya Petrovich Tchaikovsky, the enterprise was reprofiled from purely metallurgical to machine-building. In 1847, the plant started to produce boats and, in 1868, steam locomotives. As the plant was situated on the banks of a small and shallow river, it had no connection with the country's railway network. Therefore steamboats and other vessels had to be produced prior to regular annual cycles of flooding in spring. For this purpose, a weir was made on the enterprise territory to form a small-scale accumulative pond. In spring, massive rushing torrents of melting water filled the pond, flooding the shipyard area. This enabled new vessels to come to the surface. After they opened the weir's gates, and new steamboats began to be floated down the rivers Votka and Siva, and from there to the Kama River. In total, the enterprise produced about 400 vessels of various types. Similarly, steam locomotives left the plant during the annual spring flooding season. They were shipped on special barges down the river to the nearest railway station. This situation had lasted until 1916, when the plant was linked with the country’s railway network. In total, the factory produced 631 steam locomotives of different series.

Towards the end of the 19th century, the plant began to produce steelwork elements for railway bridges, as the Trans-Siberian Railway was under construction. In terms of its contribution to the overall length of constructed bridges in the Russian Empire, the Votkinsk ironworks took the first place in 1915. Gradually, the production of steam locomotives was increasingly being brought to the forefront of the enterprise’s activities, accounting for about 40% of its productive capacities.

From 1917 until 1957 
During the Civil War, the plant was numerously looted by all the warring parties, as a result it basically ceased its activities and was mothballed in 1922. On September 9, 1925, the plant reopened as a manufacturer of agricultural equipment.

In the period 1930-1937, the plant was administered by the All-union association of heavy industry. It produced high-performance steam diggers and gold mining drags.

On 1 January 1938, the plant was handed over to the People's Commissariat of Defence Industry of the USSR and switched to production of ammunition and armaments. On March 11, 1938, it was rebranded as the plant number 235.

From the outset of the Great Patriotic War in 1941, the plant started to produce the 45 mm antitank cannon M1937 53-K and  launched production of the 76 mm divisional gun M1942 (ZiS-3) in 1943.

In the early postwar period until 1957, the plant produced 100 mm air defense gun KS-19, 57 mm anti-tank gun M1943 (ZiS-2) and other weapons. It also manufactured products for civil purposes, including (traction engines for agriculture, narrow-gauge locomotives and tower cranes).

Missile production (from 1957 to the present time) 
In 1957, by the resolution of the Central Committee of the Communist Party of the USSR and the Council of Ministers of the USSR, the enterprise was converted into the country's primary producer of ballistic missiles for the Soviet Armed Forces.

In 1958, the plant delivered the first short-range attack missiles 8A61 developed by the Design Bureau-1 with a liquid-fueled engine and with a range of 150 km, adopted in July 1955.

Also, the plant produced a nuclear modification of 8A61 called 8К11, and starting from 1960, its successor was released - the tactical ballistic missiles 8K14 developed by the Design Bureau-385 with a range of up to 300 km. This rocket was mass-produced for over 25 years and used by the Armed Forces of the Union of Soviet Socialist Republics for more than 30 years.

In 1962, by resolution of the Central Committee of the Communist Party of the USSR and the Council of Ministers of the USSR, the Votkinsk Machine Building Plant started to master the production of more powerful tactical missiles 9M76, being a part of the mobile theatre ballistic missile TR-1 Temp. The first serial missile systems rolled out of the plant in 1966.

"TR-1 Temp" became a first missile system with a solid-fuelled piloted ballistic rocket adopted by the Armed Forces of the Union of Soviet Socialist Republics. Subsequently, however, those missiles were terminated in accordance to the Intermediate-Range Nuclear Forces Treaty between the USA and the USSR from 8 December 1987.

In 1974, the plant began to produce intercontinental missiles 15ZH42 for the mobile intercontinental ballistic missile complex SS-16 Sinner, in 1975 - the intermediate-range ballistic missiles 15ZH45 for the complex SS-20 Saber, in 1976 - the short-range attack missiles 9M714 for the complex OTR-23 Oka, and in 1989 - the tactical missiles 9M79-1 fot the complex OTR-21 Tochka.

In 1998, the plant launched the production of one of the most recent intercontinental ballistic missiles "RT-2PM2 Topol-M".

In 2006, the plant started mass production of the missiles "9K720 Iskander" (its NATO reporting name is SS-26 Stone).

Production

The company's products include R-11/SS-1B Scud-A and B SRBMs; RT-21M/SS-20 Saber and SS-23 Spider IRBMs; RT-21 (SS-16 Sinner), RT-2PM (SS-25 Sickle) and RT-2UTTH Topol-M (SS-27) ICBMs. It also manufactures oil and gas equipment, refrigeration equipment, metal-cutting equipment, castings, forgings, stampings and domestic electric appliances.

Votkinsk was also responsible for the production of the Cold War era SS-20 intermediate-range ballistic missile and many other well-known designs by the Moscow Institute of Thermal Technology.

Missiles

R-17 Elbrus
RT-21M Pioneer
RT-21 Temp 2S
RT-2PM Topol
RT-2UTTH Topol M
RS-24
RSM-56 Bulava

See also
United Rocket and Space Corporation

References

External links
Votkinsk Machine Building Plant at the Nuclear Threat Initiative

Aerospace companies of Russia
Defence companies of the Soviet Union
Defence companies of Russia
Moscow Institute of Thermal Technology
Companies nationalised by the Soviet Union
Companies based in Udmurtia